Meritamen (also spelled Meritamun, Merytamen, Merytamun, Meryt-Amen; ancient Egyptian: Beloved of Amun) was a daughter and later Great Royal Wife of Pharaoh Ramesses the Great.

Family 

Meritamen was a daughter of Ramesses and one of his wives, Nefertari. She appears as the fourth daughter in the list of daughters in Abu Simbel and had at least four brothers: Amun-her-khepeshef, Pareherwenemef, Meryre and Meryatum, as well as a sister named Henuttawy. Meritamen may have had more brothers and sisters, but these five are known from the facade of Queen Nefertari's temple in Abu Simbel.

Her eldest brother, Amun-her-khepeshef, was the crown prince until at least year 25 of the reign of their father. Prince Prehirwenemef is known to have served in the army and is depicted in the battle scenes from Kadesh.  The youngest sibling known to us, Prince Meryatum, would later become High Priest of Re in Heliopolis.

Around the time her mother died (around the 24th or 25th regnal year), Meritamen became Great Royal Wife, along with her half-sister Bintanath.

Images of Meritamen
Meritamen is depicted in quite a few scenes in temples and is represented on several statues.

Meritamen is well known for her beautiful limestone statue, the White Queen found at the Ramesseum, the temple complex her father had built. In Kitchen's Ramesside inscriptions, the statue is attributed to Queen Tuya (mother of Ramesses II), but it is now generally thought to represent Princess-Queen Meritamen. The dorsal pillar contains the inscription: [...Chief of the Harem] of Amen-Re, Sistrum Player of Mut, Rattle-[player of Hathor ...], [...of Siut/Sai]s, danceuse of Horus, ...
She appears on the facade of the great temple of Abu Simbel. The northernmost colossus shows the Bodily King's Daughter, his beloved, Merytamen. Meritamen is accompanied by Princess Nefertari (Bodily King's Daughter), and Queen-Mother and God's Wife, Mut-Tuya.
The small temple of Abu Simbel dedicated to Queen Nefertari and the goddess Hathor is decorated with 2 large statues of Queen Nefertari and 4 large statues of Ramesses II. The statues of Nefertari are flanked by two daughters: the Princesses Meritamen and Hennutawy.
The Abu Simbel Rock stela of Viceroy of Nubia Heqanakht. The upper register shows Ramesses II and Princess Merytamen worshipping Deities. The lower register depicts the Viceroy adoring Queen Nefertari before offerings. This stela is thought to represent Meritamen in the role of deputy-Queen for her possibly ailing mother.
In Luxor, Meritamen is depicted twice on statues of her father/husband. The westernmost colossus before the pylon shows Meritamen next to her father. She is given the titles of King's Daughter and Great Royal Wife. She is also depicted on statuary in the forecourt. On the southern colonnade, eastern statue Meritamen is the queen depicted on the left.
Statue in Tanis (from Pi-Ramesse). Meritamen is depicted standing between the legs of her father. She reaches to about knee height.
Large statue of the Queen at the Temple of Ramesses II at Akhmin. On the dorsal pillar, the Queen is identified as "... whose forehead is beautiful bearing the uraeus, the beloved of her Lord, the great one [of the harem of Amen]-Re, [sistrum player] of Mut, menat player of Hathor, songstress of Atum, King's Daughter [beloved of ?] .. [Mr]it[I]mn.w." "the fair of face, beautiful in the palace, the Beloved of the Lord of the Two Lands, she who is beside her Lord as Sothis is beside Orion, one is pleased with what is spoken when she opens her mouth to pacify the Lord of the Two Lands, King's Daughter in the palace [?] of the Lord of many festivals [?] ...
Colossal statue of Ramesses II from Akhmin. The king is accompanied by two daughter-Queens. The Princess-Queen by left leg is identified as Daughter of the King, his beloved, Great King's Wife, Merytamen, may she be young. The Princess-Queen by right leg is identified as Daughter of the King, his beloved, Great King's Wife, Bint-Anath, may she live.
In Heracleopolis, an usurped Middle Kingdom statue was found with Bint-Anath and Meryetamen depicted on the base of the statue.
In the temple of Ramesses II in El Kab, there is a depiction of an Iunmutef priest and the Princesses Bint-Anath and Meryetamen. Scene includes cartouches and the princesses carry wands. Bintanat is termed "king's daughter" as well as "king's wife", while no titles are given for Merytamun. Both Merytamen and Bint-Anath have a modius without stalks, shake a sistrum, and carry a gazelle-headed wand. They face Iunmutef ("pillar of his mother"), a solar deity often associated with the crown prince.

Burial in the Queens Valley

Meritamen was buried at QV68 in the Valley of the Queens. The tomb of Meritamen was described by Lepsius. 
An interesting scene in the tomb shows Meritamen consecrating cloth-boxes to Osiris and Hathor. The inscriptions identify the Queen as The Osiris, King's Daughter, Great Royal Wife, Lady of Both Lands, Merytamen, may she live. She is said to be  "Bringing a box of clothing, eternally; consecrating the box of clothing three times" (sic).

The sarcophagus-lid is now in Berlin (15274). Meritamen's titles on the sarcophagus lid are given twice. At the head she is described as: "[King's Daughter], Great [Royal Wife], Lady of Both Lands, Merytamen, justified". Over the head she is described as: "The Osiris, King's Daughter beloved of him, Great Royal Wife, Lady of Both Lands, Merytamen, justified".

See also
 List of children of Ramesses II

References 

 Grajetzki, Wolfram: Ancient Egyptian Queens – a hieroglyphic dictionary, London 2005, p. 70

External links 
 Queen Merytamen

13th-century BC Egyptian women
Wives of Ramesses II
Children of Ramesses II
Hathor